This article contains information about the literary events and publications of 1761.

Events
August – Following the death of Johann Matthias Gesner, the chair of rhetoric at the University of Göttingen is refused by both Johann August Ernesti and David Ruhnken. It eventually goes to Christian Gottlob Heyne.
September – Carlo Goldoni informs fellow playwright Francesco Albergati Capacelli that he is moving permanently from Venice to Paris, where he is appointed director of the Italian theatre.
unknown date – Denis Diderot begins writing Rameau's Nephew

New books

Fiction
John Hawkesworth – Almoran and Hamet
William Kenrick – Eloisa
Thomas Percy (translated) – Hau Kou Choan
James Ridley (as Sir Charles Morrell) – The History of James Lovegrove
Jean-Jacques Rousseau – Julie, ou la nouvelle Héloïse
Frances Sheridan – Memoirs of Miss Sidney Bidulph
Laurence Sterne – The Life and Opinions of Tristram Shandy, Gentleman vols. iii – iv.

Drama
Isaac Bickerstaffe – Judith
Henry Brooke – The Earl of Essex (adapted)
George Colman the Elder – The Jealous Wife
Richard Cumberland – The Banishment of Cicero
Richard Glover – Medea
Carlo Goldoni
Una delle ultime sere di Carnevale
La villeggiatura (or La trilogia della villeggiatura, The Resort)
Carlo Gozzi
L'amore delle tre melarance (The Love for Three Oranges)
Il corvo (The Raven)
Arthur Murphy
All in the Wrong
The Citizen
The Old Maid

Poetry

John Armstrong – A Day: An epistle to John Wilkes
Charles Churchill
The Apology
Night: An epistle to Robert Lloyd
The Rosciad
John Cleland – The Times!, vol. 2
Francis Fawkes – Original Poems and Translations
Robert Lloyd – An Epistle to Charles Churchill
James Macpherson, "translator" – Fingal, an Ancient Epic Poem in Six Books, together with Several Other Poems composed by Ossian, the Son of Fingal, translated from the Gaelic Language
Diego de Torres Villarroel – Poesías sagradas y profanas

Non-fiction
Thomas Cole – Discourses on Luxury, Infidelity, and Enthusiasm
George Colman the Elder – Critical Reflections on the Old English Dramatick Writers
Robert Dodsley – Select Fables of Esop and Other Fabulists (anthology)
Enrique Flórez – Memorias de las reinas católicas
Edward Gibbon – Essai sur l’Étude de la Littérature
Baron d'Holbach – Christianity unveiled
Henry Home – Introduction to the Art of Thinking
David Hume – The History of England, from the Invasion of Julius Caesar to the Accession of Henry VII
Joseph Priestley – The Rudiments of English Grammar
Tiphaigne de la Roche – L'Empire des Zaziris sur les humains ou la Zazirocratie
Martín Sarmiento – Noticia sobre la verdadera patria de Cervantes
Benjamin Victor – History of the Theatres of London and Dublin vol. 1–2

Births
March 8 – Jan Potocki, Polish count, military engineer, ethnologist, Egyptologist, linguist, aeronaut, adventurer and novelist (suicide 1815)
May 3 – August von Kotzebue, German dramatist (died 1819)
July 25 – Charlotte von Kalb, German writer (died 1843)
September 8 – François Juste Marie Raynouard, French dramatist (died 1836)
September 13 – Santō Kyōden, born Iwase Samuru, Japanese fiction writer, poet and artist (died 1816)
November 13 – Elizabeth Meeke, English popular novelist (died c.1826)
Unknown dates
Mary Pilkington, English novelist, poet and children's writer (died 1839)
Mariana Starke, English playwright and travel writer (died 1838)

Deaths 
February 25 – Daniel Henchman, Colonial American bookseller and publisher (born 1689)
April 9 – William Law, English theologian (born 1686)
April 15 – William Oldys, English antiquary and bibliographer (born 1696)
April 17 – Benjamin Hoadly, English bishop and instigator of the Bangorian Controversy (born 1676)
July 4 – Samuel Richardson, English novelist (born 1689)
August 3 – Johann Matthias Gesner, German librarian and classicist (born 1691)
December 15 – Henrietta Louisa Fermor, Countess of Pomfret, English letter writer (born 1698)

References

 
Years of the 18th century in literature